The Chern Prize in Mathematics was established in  in honor of Professor Shiing-Shen Chern. The Chern Prize is presented every three years at the International Congress of Chinese Mathematicians to Chinese mathematicians and those of Chinese descent for "exceptional contributions to mathematical research or to public service activities in support of mathematics". Winners are selected by a committee of mathematicians to recognize the achievements of mathematicians of Chinese descent. In 2010, a special commemorative event was held in Beijing in addition to the normal award presentation to celebrate the centennial of Professor Chern's birth.

Past winners

See also 
 Morningside Medal
 List of mathematics awards

References 

Mathematics awards